Estadio Alfredo Beranger is a football stadium in Turdera, Buenos Aires, Argentina.  It is the home ground of Club Atlético Temperley, who drew an average home league attendance of 11,000 in the 2016–17 season. The stadium holds 24,000 people and opened on 13 April 1924. It is named after Alfredo Martín Beranger, who was the president of the club in the 1920s.

References

External links

 Estadio Alfredo Beranger

Alfredo Beranger
Sports venues in Buenos Aires Province